Celin Romero (born November 23, 1936 in Málaga) is a classical guitarist and member of the guitar quartet the Romeros. He is the eldest son of Celedonio Romero, who in 1957 left Spain for the United States with his family.

On February 11, 2000 at the USC Thornton School of Music, he and his brothers, Pepe and Angel, were each presented with the Grand Cross of Isabel la Catolica (the highest honour that can be offered in Spain), and were knighted for their musical accomplishments; the ceremony included a gala performance by The Romeros and the Thornton Chamber Orchestra.

In addition to his busy concert schedule, Romero is Professor of Music and Guitar at the University of California, San Diego.

References

External links
Celin Romero Interview - NAMM Oral History Library (2015)

American classical guitarists
American male guitarists
Spanish classical guitarists
Spanish male guitarists
1936 births
Living people
Musicians awarded knighthoods
20th-century American guitarists
20th-century American male musicians